Slavoljub Marjanović (born 6 January 1955) is a Serbian chess Grandmaster (GM) (1978), Yugoslav Chess Championship winner (1985), Chess Olympiad team bronze medal winner (1980), FIDE Senior Trainer (2004).

Biography
Slavoljub Marjanović learned to play chess at the age of five. He three times in row won Yugoslav Junior Chess Championship (1971–1973). He played for Yugoslavia in the World Junior Chess Championships, where in 1973 shared 3rd - 5th place, but in 1974 shared 2nd - 4th place. Slavoljub Marjanović is winner of many international chess tournaments, including winning Belgrade (1979), Vrnjačka Banja (1983) and Rome (1988).

In 1977, he was awarded the FIDE International Master (IM) title and received the FIDE Grandmaster (GM) title year later. In 1985, in Novi Sad he won Yugoslav Chess Championship. In 1987, in Subotica he participated in World Chess Championship Interzonal tournament, where ranked 7th place.

Slavoljub Marjanović played for Yugoslavia in the Chess Olympiads:
 In 1980, at first reserve board in the 24th Chess Olympiad in La Valletta (+4, =4, -0) and won team bronze medal,
 In 1984, at second reserve board in the 26th Chess Olympiad in Thessaloniki (+4, =7, -1).

Slavoljub Marjanović played for Yugoslavia in the European Team Chess Championships:
 In 1980, at sixth board in the 7th European Team Chess Championship in Skara (+2, =3, -2).

Also Slavoljub Marjanović eight times played for Yugoslavia in the Men's Chess Balkaniads (1977–1980, 1983–1985, 1988) and in team competition won 6 gold (1978, 1979, 1980, 1983, 1985) and 2 silver (1977, 1988) medals, but in individual competition won 3 gold (1979, 1980, 1988), silver (1978) and 3 bronze (1977, 1983, 1985) medals.

He known as a chess trainer. In 2004 he received the title of FIDE Senior Trainer.

References

External links
 
 
 

1955 births
Living people
Sportspeople from Niš
Chess grandmasters
Yugoslav chess players
Serbian chess players
Chess Olympiad competitors
Chess coaches